Parmo, or Teesside Parmesan, is a dish originating in Middlesbrough, North Yorkshire, and a popular item of take-away food in the Teesside area. It consists of a breaded cutlet of chicken or pork topped with a white béchamel sauce and cheese, usually cheddar cheese. The name of the dish is a reference to the dish chicken parmigiana, which is made with tomato sauce and mozzarella. In an April 2019 survey, parmo ranked 20th in Britain's Top 20 Favourite Takeaways.

History

Origins
Parmo is said to have been created by Nicos Harris, a Greek American navy chef. He was wounded off the coast of France, and brought to the United Kingdom to be treated at what is now James Cook University Hospital, Middlesbrough. He stayed in Middlesbrough and opened a restaurant, The American Grill, on Linthorpe Road, where he created the parmo in 1958. His son-in-law, Caramello, still lived in Teesside as of 2014, continuing the family tradition.

Supermarket sales
In 2009, supermarket chain Asda started selling parmo in their shops in Teesside. They claimed they were selling 6,000 chicken parmos a week, making them at the time the shop's fastest-selling line. Asda later expanded this line to branches outside Teesside.

Nutritional information
In 2007, North Yorkshire Trading Standards conducted a survey of 25 fast food dishes. A large parmo with chips and salad they tested contained about 2,600 calories and 150g of fat.

See also

 Escalope
 Parma, origin of parmesan cheese
 List of deep fried foods
 Wiener schnitzel
 Chicken fried steak

References

External links
April Fool Evening Gazette article about the "history" of parmo 

Breaded cutlets
English cuisine
Fast food
Food and drink introduced in 1958
Yorkshire cuisine
Deep fried foods
British chicken dishes
British pork dishes
Cheese dishes